The Falcon and the Winter Soldier is an American television miniseries created by Malcolm Spellman for the streaming service Disney+, based on Marvel Comics featuring the characters Sam Wilson / Falcon and Bucky Barnes / Winter Soldier. It is the second television series in the Marvel Cinematic Universe (MCU) produced by Marvel Studios, sharing continuity with the films of the franchise, and is set six months after Sam Wilson was handed the mantle of Captain America in the film Avengers: Endgame (2019). Wilson teams up with Bucky Barnes to stop anti-patriots who believe the world was better during the Blip. Spellman served as head writer for the series, which was directed by Kari Skogland.

Sebastian Stan and Anthony Mackie reprise their respective roles as Barnes and Wilson from the film series, with Wyatt Russell, Erin Kellyman, Danny Ramirez, Georges St-Pierre, Adepero Oduye, Don Cheadle, Daniel Brühl, Emily VanCamp, Florence Kasumba, and Julia Louis-Dreyfus also starring. By September 2018, Marvel Studios was developing a number of limited series for Disney+ centered on supporting characters from the MCU films, such as Wilson and Barnes. Spellman was hired in October, and chose to focus on the racial and political issues raised by Wilson, a Black man, being handed Captain America's shield at the end of Endgame. The Falcon and the Winter Soldier was announced in April 2019, when Stan and Mackie were confirmed to be starring. Skogland was hired to direct the next month. Filming began in October 2019 in Atlanta, Georgia, before moving to the Czech Republic in March 2020. Production was halted due to the COVID-19 pandemic, but resumed in Atlanta in September before wrapping in the Czech Republic in October.

The Falcon and the Winter Soldier premiered on March 19, 2021, and ran for six episodes until April 23. It is part of Phase Four of the MCU. The series received positive reviews, with critics highlighting the actors' chemistry and the series' social commentary but criticizing its pacing. It received several accolades, including five Primetime Emmy Award nominations. A feature film, Captain America: New World Order (2024), co-written by Spellman, is in development as a continuation of the series.

Premise 
Six months after being handed the mantle of Captain America at the end of Avengers: Endgame (2019), Sam Wilson teams up with Bucky Barnes on a global mission to stop an anti-patriotism group, the Flag Smashers, who are enhanced with a recreation of the Super Soldier Serum and believe the world was better during the Blip.

Cast and characters 

 Sebastian Stan as Bucky Barnes / Winter Soldier:An enhanced soldier and Steve Rogers's best friend during the 1940s who was presumed killed in action during World War II, before re-emerging as a brainwashed assassin in the present day. Head writer Malcolm Spellman noted that Barnes has done "nothing but fight" in the last 100 years, and the series could not avoid the trauma that he has gone through. Stan explained that Barnes would be struggling with his murderous past while also adjusting to life in the 21st century without Rogers, and was having an identity crisis. Co-executive producer Zoie Nagelhout explained that Barnes would be working to "unburden himself" from his life as the Winter Soldier but the darker side of the character would still be seen during the series.
 Anthony Mackie as Sam Wilson / Falcon / Captain America:An Avenger and a former pararescueman who was trained by the military in aerial combat using a specially-designed wing pack. Wilson was handed Captain America's shield by Rogers at the end of Avengers: Endgame (2019), and the series expands on this moment to explore the implications of a Black man being given that mantle. Wilson initially continues to use the Falcon moniker in the series, and Mackie said the story would portray the shield as being a burden for the character. He added that Wilson is questioning how "a Black man [can] represent a country that does not represent him". Wilson eventually takes up the shield to become the new Captain America.
 Wyatt Russell as John Walker / Captain America / U.S. Agent:A decorated Captain of the U.S. Army Rangers, and the new Captain America chosen by the U.S. government. He attempts to join Wilson and Barnes in their fight, and believes he is a better embodiment of American values than Rogers was. After being stripped of the Captain America title, Walker is given the moniker U.S. Agent by Valentina Allegra de Fontaine. Spellman described Walker as a soldier who has "done everything his country has ever asked" and is now faced with a reality where his life and sense of duty to the United States "challenge [him] in a way that upsets and obliterates [his] privilege". Russell added that Walker was a "company man" who might venture into "the grey areas" to complete the mission. He was attracted to the character's "dichotomies", and he had room to shape the character since this is his introduction to the MCU. Spellman said Walker was inspired by the comic book character, who uses the moniker U.S. Agent, but the series had shifted away from the comic book portrayal to add some different dimensions to this version. Executive producer Kevin Feige added that a White man, Russell, was specifically cast as the new Captain America as commentary on how the U.S. government would not want a Black man like Wilson to take on that role.
 Erin Kellyman as Karli Morgenthau:The leader of the anti-patriotism group the Flag Smashers, who are enhanced with a recreation of the Super Soldier Serum and believe the world was better during the Blip, fighting for open national borders. Spellman called Morgenthau "the glue for the series". Flag-Smasher in the comics is an identity assumed by male characters, notably Karl Morgenthau. Kellyman felt it was "important" the character was gender-swapped for the series, giving young women a character they could "look up to and relate to now". She added since Karli is not a middle-aged man like Karl, Karli's outlook on life and actions she takes come from a different perspective.
 Danny Ramirez as Joaquin Torres:A first lieutenant in the U.S. Air Force who serves as Wilson's support staff and is investigating the Flag Smashers. Director Kari Skogland called Torres "a bit of a puppy dog" who is a fan of the Falcon and enjoys getting to work alongside him.
 Georges St-Pierre as Georges Batroc: A mercenary who is the leader of the criminal group LAF.
 Adepero Oduye as Sarah Wilson:Sam's sister who runs the Wilson family fishing business in Louisiana. Sarah represents Sam's life growing up in the South and was included in the series to have strong opinions and present a crucial aspect for Sam regarding his choice to take up the mantle of Captain America.
 Don Cheadle as James "Rhodey" Rhodes:An officer in the U.S. Air Force and Avenger. Skogland explained that Rhodes plays a mentor role for Wilson in the series, giving him reasons for and against taking up the mantle of Captain America while also providing a view of the wider world following the Blip.
 Daniel Brühl as Helmut Zemo:A Sokovian baron who was responsible for breaking up the Avengers in Captain America: Civil War (2016). The series introduces Zemo's traditional purple mask from the comics, which Brühl was enthusiastic about wearing; he felt like a "baron" wearing the updated costume, which points towards the "aristocratic" Baron Zemo version of the character from the comics. Brühl was thrilled to return to the role and enjoyed the increased sense of humor for the character, adding the series felt both known and fresh to him compared to Civil War. Skogland was excited to explore Zemo's complexity following the dark place that Civil War left him in, with the series showing that he has lost everything and is paying for his crimes. Spellman said the series would explore Zemo's origin story and show how the character views himself as a hero.
 Emily VanCamp as Sharon Carter / Power Broker:A former agent of S.H.I.E.L.D. and the CIA, and Peggy Carter's niece, who has become the criminal leader of Madripoor known as the Power Broker, after being on the run since she was last seen in Civil War. VanCamp explained that Carter is in a "pretty dark place" at the start of the series, and she was interested to explore new sides of her such as her anger, adding Carter had "a bit more edge" and a "chip on her shoulder". Though the series does not explain much of what Carter went through since she was last seen, with co-executive producer Zoie Nagelhout noting that the character had her arc offscreen, VanCamp said seeing where she has ended up was meant to give "a sense that it hasn't always been easy, and that the sacrifices she's made weren't always worth it in her mind". When VanCamp learned that Carter was the Power Broker, she felt it solidified the version of the character that appears in the series, and called the reveal "very fitting [since] she was hurt and scorned and went rogue". Spellman said the writers chose not to "be fake" by simply saying she had been in hiding, but rather, since she previously had "a very youthful quality to her", Carter was able to "[grow] up" because of being scorned by the intelligence community.
 Florence Kasumba as Ayo: A member of the Dora Milaje, Wakanda's all-female special forces.
 Julia Louis-Dreyfus as Valentina Allegra de Fontaine:A contessa who meets with Walker and gives him the moniker U.S. Agent. Executive producer Nate Moore described Fontaine as a funnier but darker version of Nick Fury who has secrets and operates in the "moral gray area", with Feige describing her as "in recruitment mode".

Recurring members of the Flag Smashers include Desmond Chiam as Dovich, Dani Deetté as Gigi, Indya Bussey as DeeDee, Renes Rivera as Lennox, Tyler Dean Flores as Diego, and Noah Mills as Nico. Also recurring are Amy Aquino as Christina Raynor, Barnes's therapist; Chase River McGee and Aaron Haynes as Sam Wilson's nephews Cass and AJ; Alphie Hyorth as a U.S. senator who is the U.S. representative on the Global Repatriation Council (GRC); Clé Bennett as Lemar Hoskins / Battlestar, a sergeant major in the U.S. Army and Walker's Captain America strike force partner; Carl Lumbly as Isaiah Bradley, an African-American Korean War veteran and super soldier who was imprisoned and experimented on for 30 years; Elijah Richardson as Isaiah's grandson Eli Bradley; and Gabrielle Byndloss as Olivia Walker, John's wife.

Additional guest stars include Ken Takemoto as Yori Nakajima, the father of one of the Winter Soldier's victims; Miki Ishikawa as Leah, a waitress who has a date with Barnes; Ness Bautista as Matias, a member of the Flag Smashers; Neal Kodinsky as Rudy, a supporter of the Flag Smashers; Veronica Falcón as Donya Madani, Morgenthau's adoptive mother; Olli Haaskivi as Wilfred Nagel, the scientist who recreated the Super Soldier Serum; and Nicholas Pryor as Oeznik, Zemo's butler. Janeshia Adams-Ginyard and Zola Williams portray Nomble and Yama, respectively, both members of the Dora Milaje. Other GRC members include Salem Murphy as Lacont, the representative from India, and Jane Rumbaua as Ayla Perez, the representative from the Philippines. Good Morning America correspondent Sara Haines makes a cameo appearance as herself.

Episodes

Production

Development 
By September 2018, Marvel Studios was developing several limited series for its parent company Disney's streaming service, Disney+, to be centered on supporting characters from the Marvel Cinematic Universe (MCU) films who had not starred in their own films. The actors who portrayed the characters in the films were expected to reprise their roles for the limited series. The series were expected to be six to eight episodes each and have a "hefty [budget] rivaling those of a major studio production". The series would be produced by Marvel Studios rather than Marvel Television, which produced previous television series in the MCU. Marvel Studios President Kevin Feige was believed to be taking a "hands-on role" in each series' development, focusing on "continuity of story" with the films and "handling" the actors who would be reprising their roles from the films.

Malcolm Spellman was one of several writers asked to pitch a series focusing on Anthony Mackie's Sam Wilson / Falcon and Sebastian Stan's Bucky Barnes / Winter Soldier. Feige believed the MCU films had not explored these two characters enough, and Marvel Studios especially wanted to explore the pair more after seeing the audience reaction to their "fun dynamic" in the MCU films Captain America: The Winter Soldier (2014) and Captain America: Civil War (2016). Mackie and Stan had both previously expressed interest in starring in an MCU spin-off film together, with Stan comparing the idea to buddy comedy films like Midnight Run (1988) and 48 Hrs. (1982). It was Marvel Studios' intention for the series to use the "buddy two-hander" format like those films. Each writer developed their pitch for the series with a Marvel Studios executive; Spellman worked with Nate Moore, and his pitch focused on race and identity. He gave 48 Hrs., The Defiant Ones (1958), Lethal Weapon (1987), and Rush Hour (1998) as examples of buddy films that dealt with issues of race and which he wanted to model the series after. Spellman had a migraine when he pitched his take to Feige, and he felt that the presentation did not go well. Moore advocated for Spellman and his approach, which the writer felt was because Moore agreed that focusing on race was the right direction for the series. Spellman was hired to write the limited series by the end of October 2018. Feige felt Spellman was the right person for the job because he understood what was needed to make the series fun and action-packed, while also being a Black male television writer which gave him the point of view that was needed to tell the type of story about Wilson that Marvel Studios wanted to tell.

The series was announced in April 2019 as The Falcon and the Winter Soldier. Kari Skogland was hired the next month to direct all six episodes, which are around 45–55 minutes each, with budgets reported to be as much as $25 million. Feige, Louis D'Esposito, Victoria Alonso, Moore, Skogland, and Spellman executive produced the series, which is retitled Captain America and the Winter Soldier in the sixth episode's credits.

Writing 
In addition to Spellman, writers for the series include Michael Kastelein, Derek Kolstad, Dalan Musson, and Josef Sawyer; Kolstad joined the series' in July 2019. The series is set six months after the film Avengers: Endgame (2019), which depicts Steve Rogers bequeathing his shield and the mantle of Captain America to Wilson. Feige said this was intended to be a "classic passing of the torch from one hero to another", but when Marvel Studios got the opportunity to make television series for Disney+ they decided to expand this into an entire story about Wilson, who is a Black man, becoming Captain America. Skogland called the series "a story about the first Black Captain America". Mackie was hesitant about the series because he felt it would not be able to match the quality of the MCU films, and he did not want a Black actor to be the lead of Marvel's first failure, but he was won over by Spellman's writing. Mackie said the series would explore Wilson's backstory and treat him as a "regular guy" in a world of superheroes, while "walk[ing] the line of who is going to take up the [Captain America] shield" after Endgame. He felt that there was a specific "brand of person" that was expected of Captain America, and part of Wilson questioning the mantle came from knowing as a Black man that "you can't be the same person in every room you walk in because every person you meet expects a different person". Spellman felt the series was "a nice progression" from the themes of racial identity that were presented in Marvel Studios' Black Panther (2018), and was hopeful that the series would have a positive impact on Black youth like that film did. He noted that in addition to himself and Moore, over half of the series' writing staff was also Black which reinforced the series' portrayal of Wilson as a "decidedly Black character". Mackie said he was picking up the mantle left by Black Panther star Chadwick Boseman, who died in August 2020. Stan explained that Barnes feels protective of Rogers's legacy, and wants Wilson to become Captain America since he was Rogers's choice. The doubt that Wilson has about taking on the role becomes a conflict for Barnes. Regarding Wilson's progression in the series from being reluctant to wield the shield to ultimately using it, Skogland indicated that he needed "to engage in both a public and private conversation of what it means for a Black man to pick up such an iconic historically White symbol" which would help him define what it means to be a hero in modern society versus when Rogers became Captain America in the 1940s. Skogland also believed this was an important progression for the viewers to have along with Wilson since "the shield means different things to different people" and all aspects of it as a symbol needed to be explored.

Kolstad said he would be bringing "a wink and a nod" to the style of world building and character development from his film franchise John Wick. Feige said the series would be more of a reflection of the real world than previous MCU projects, with composer Henry Jackman saying the series deals with "less comfortable... weighty issues" such as what kind of person should hold the shield and how a Black man would feel about being Captain America. Skogland added that other topical, "hard-to-talk about issues" that the series explores include ideas of patriotism and extremism, asking the questions: "Who is an American, and who gets to decide what principles the country stands for? What compels people to take extreme actions in the name of what they believe is patriotism?" Skogland noted that Captain America has always been used to explore political ideas, since the character's first comic book in 1941 where he was depicted punching Adolf Hitler. Stan said viewers would be able to compare events in the series to the 2021 storming of the United States Capitol, though this was unintentional since the series was written before that event.

The Blip—where half of all life in the universe disappeared in Avengers: Infinity War (2018) and returned during Endgame—is The Falcon and the Winter Soldiers "primary source of conflict" with the characters all responding to it, with Spellman noting they wanted this crisis to be something viewers could identify with, adding the heroes, their problems, and their worldviews were "of the times". Spellman made a parallel connection between the Blip and the COVID-19 pandemic, since the series' setting was described as "a world striving for stability after a global catastrophe". He felt that a global event like the Blip or a pandemic could unite or divide, and each episode of the series is defined by this "push-pull". One of the series' antagonists, the Flag Smashers, are an anarchist, anti-patriotism group who believe the world was better during the Blip and were "born" out of that event. The Flag Smashers and Helmut Zemo all believe they are heroes and are responding to the Blip with views that the protagonists and wider population concede to contain valid points. Skogland believed setting the series six months after the Blip was critical, as that is when the complications of everyone returning begin to surpass the initial shock and joy. Co-executive producer Zoie Nagelhout and Moore said the series would show Wilson and Barnes attempting to figure out their identities, and the Blip would affect this. Spellman added that identity is one of the main themes of The Falcon and the Winter Soldier, with the story forcing Wilson, Barnes, Sharon Carter, and Zemo to each "rethink how they see themselves and confront how the world sees them".

Jackman described the series as a psychological drama, while Mackie and Stan said it was "part action-packed superhero epic, part awkward buddy-comedy". Stan compared the series' tone to the more realistic and grounded MCU film Captain America: The Winter Soldier. He added that having a longer running time than a film allowed the series to explore the personal lives of the title characters and show what a day in each of their lives is like, and said it would combine the characters' existing relationship with the actors' offscreen dynamic. Spellman wanted to "go home" with the characters and let the actors show their skills rather than simply focus on action, and he said the spirit and conflict of the title characters were what remained consistent as the project developed from his initial pitch to the final series. He compared them to fire and ice, saying, "Sam reacts spontaneously from the gut, and Bucky is more cold and calculated". Spellman said there was a "12 second moment in Civil War where it feels like every single Marvel fan knew that [Wilson and Barnes were going to] be able to support a movie or a franchise", referring to a scene in which the two characters bicker over the placement of Wilson's seat. The series builds on the chemistry from that scene rather than developing its tone from scratch. The writers also referenced the various press interviews done by Mackie and Stan to help craft the character's relationship and dynamic together. Skogland and Spellman noted that Wilson and Barnes are not necessarily friends in the films, but they have Rogers as a "common denominator". Without Rogers, the pair's underlying relationship is now "laid bare" and forced to develop. Stan said that without Rogers, Barnes and Wilson went into "opposite corners in terms of facing their lives [and] their demons", but they were each asking the same questions.

Some of the early elements selected to feature in the series, before the hiring of Spellman, was the inclusions of Zemo and Valentina Allegra de Fontaine, and that Carter would be the Power Broker. Making Carter the Power Broker was inspired by a Captain America comic from the 1990s where Carter was exiled from S.H.I.E.L.D. for years which made her "super salty". Anthony and Joe Russo and Christopher Markus and Stephen McFeely, the directors and writers of Avengers: Infinity War and Avengers: Endgame, had tried to incorporate Carter into those films numerous times, but ultimately did not given the vast number of other characters already featured. When development began for the Disney+ series, Moore felt the concept for The Falcon and the Winter Soldier was "becoming the story of Sharon Carter".

Spellman created the series using his general knowledge of Marvel Comics and the MCU, along with that of Moore and Nagelhout, rather than basing it on specific comic books, though he did name Truth: Red, White & Black as a large influence on the series. Moore disliked that comic when he read it, but liked the ideas it posed and felt Spellman, who strongly advocated for using elements of the comic, had integrated those story elements into the series in a smart way. Feige was nervous about adapting Truth because he felt they would not be able to do justice to it and its main character, Isaiah Bradley, if they were only a small part of the series, but he changed his mind when he saw how central Isaiah was to the series' themes. Skogland said the writers created unique characters for the series and would go back to the comics to find appropriate names that fit those archetypes, even if they were not direct translations from how they were used in the comics; the Flag Smashers were an example of this. Kolstad felt it was interesting to take secondary characters from the films and put them in primary roles for the series, and added that other characters from earlier MCU films are layered into the series and shift the storytelling in new ways. With the acquisition of 21st Century Fox by Disney allowing Marvel Studios to regain the film rights to the X-Men and Fantastic Four properties, Marvel Studios was able to include elements from those properties in the series. This includes the location Madripoor, which Feige said was "more of an Easter egg in and of itself". Ahead of the series premiere, Spellman said there were three projects from Marvel Studios he knew of that would tie-in to the series.

Casting 

With the official announcement of the series in April 2019 came confirmation that Mackie and Stan would reprise their roles of Wilson and Barnes, respectively, in the series. The next month, Daniel Brühl and Emily VanCamp entered negotiations to reprise their respective film roles of Helmut Zemo and Sharon Carter. Brühl was confirmed for the series in July 2019, and VanCamp was confirmed a month later when Wyatt Russell was announced as cast in the role of John Walker. Russell's past work portraying "the slacker with long hair and a beard" did not lend itself to this role, but Marvel liked how his "unique energy" differentiated Walker from Wilson and Barnes.

Set photos in November 2019 revealed Adepero Oduye would appear in the series, portraying Sam's sister Sarah Wilson, Additional set photos in September 2020 revealed Georges St-Pierre would be reprising his role as Georges Batroc from Captain America: The Winter Soldier, and that Erin Kellyman had joined the cast, portraying Karli Morgenthau. The following month, Danny Ramirez was cast in the "pivotal role" of Joaquin Torres. Kellyman's involvement was confirmed in December. In February 2021, Don Cheadle revealed that he appears in the series in his MCU role of James "Rhodey" Rhodes. Florence Kasumba also reprises her role as Ayo from past MCU films. Julia Louis-Dreyfus was cast as Valentina Allegra de Fontaine. Louis-Dreyfus had been expected to first appear in Black Widow (2021) before delays pushed the film's release to be after the series. Feige "geeked out" over casting Louis-Dreyfus due to her being an "icon" for her role in Seinfeld.

In December 2019, Desmond Chiam and Miki Ishikawa joined the cast, and Noah Mills was cast a month later. In February 2020, Carl Lumbly joined the cast as Isaiah Bradley. A year later, the series' trailer revealed Amy Aquino had been cast in the series as Dr. Christina Raynor, Barnes's therapist. Janeshia Adams-Ginyard and Zola Williams reprise their roles as Nomble and Yama, respectively, members of the Dora Milaje, from previous MCU films.

Design

Sets 
Production designer Ray Chan and the producers wanted to give the series a "global feel" right away given the script. He designed two sets, with the majority of filming occurring on location. His sets for Madripoor were built at Pinewood Atlanta Studios Atlanta, as the production team originally planned to film Madripoor scenes in southeastern Asian countries such as Myanmar, Thailand, and Vietnam, but could not due to scheduling difficulties. The interior of Sam Wilson's home was also built at Pinewood.

Costumes 
Costume designer Michael Crow had "extrapolated some of his [Wilson's] previous streetwear looks from Captain America: The Winter Soldier and Captain America: Civil War". He had also discussed costume design with Mackie and wanted to add some more color and texture to match the "muted" color palette of the series. He added that he wanted Louisiana to be a "bright spot" and symbolize the "happy place in his life" as the rest of the series was "dark and moody". For Barnes, Crow was influenced by the classic Americana style and wanted him to have the same "flavor" as Steve Rogers, as he felt that both characters are similar, in that they were people from the 1940s who are "sort of stuck in this modern world".

Suits for superheroes were designed by a team of people at Marvel Studios based on illustrations with input from the costume designing department for practicality. When creating the Captain America suit for Wilson, Crow had discussed the amount of white used in the costume and ultimately felt that "it was a much bolder statement to have as much white as we ended up with because it’s so different from everything we’ve seen before". He also wanted to avoid the suit looking like "a conglomeration of Captain America costumes that have come before added to the Falcon costume". During fabrication of the suit, he incorporated Wakandan elements into the design as the suit had been built in Wakanda. In contrast, Walker's Captain America suit was "more structured, more armored, and darker". The shoulders were also amplified by the team as they wanted Walker to feel more massive than Rogers, and also sought to make him feel "intimidating and dark". His suit was created from fabric and costume. Discussing Zemo's coat, he initially wanted the coat to feel like an "old Sokovian military uniform", and took inspiration from traditional Slavic clothing and Polish and Russian overcoats from World War II. Fur was also added to the coats to keep the costume faithful to the comic.

Crow wanted each member of the Flag Smashers to feel unique to each member while still being a collective. He described their costumes as feeling "grounded", "interesting", and "unique", and consulted with the actors prior to designing their costumes. Additionally, he chose to minimize their designs as he wanted them to feel like they were coming from refugee camps. The costume team had designed their masks by hand and had chosen a design which was vacuum-formed by a member from the team who also had added a texture to it. The concept team then had designed the logo, and after experimenting with the colors of the mask, they eventually chose a color scheme they felt was "right and practical".

Main-on-end title sequence 

The series' main-on-end title sequence was created by Perception, who took inspiration from the series' political messages and ideologies. The design features "propaganda plastered across city walls [with] multiple layers of graffiti and flyers put up, torn down, and defaced". Perception used movement and lighting to create a "mysterious ambiance to match the show's atmosphere", and included various hidden messages and Easter eggs in the sequence, such as references to the Enhanced Humans Act and Thaddeus "Thunderbolt" Ross; the Sokovia Accords; Karli Morgenthau via a wanted poster that mentions various attacks by the Flag Smashers; Madripoor and the Brass Monkey Saloon; past attempts to replicate the Captain America program, including Isaiah Bradley being labeled a "subject"; and the Power Broker.

Filming 
Filming began on October 31, 2019, at Pinewood Atlanta Studios in Atlanta, Georgia, with Skogland directing, and P.J. Dillon serving as cinematographer. The series was filmed under the working title Tag Team. Dillon used a Panavision DXL2 8K camera with a T series Panavision anamorphic prime lens for filming. During filming, he had de-tuned the lenses for the Panavision C series as he "didn't want it to look too pristine and, in terms of the lighting choices, we shot low light a lot and used a lot of smoke" to give the shots their texture. Skogland and Dillon consulted and devised different lighting strategies based on the tone. Mackie and Stan announced the official start of filming on November 4. Mackie compared the production to an MCU film, saying it felt like shooting a six-hour film that would then be cut up into individual episodes rather than filming one episode at a time. Feige said the series would have the "cinematic experience" of an MCU film across six episodes, while Skogland felt the series was "relatable" to the films since it featured "action, comedy, [a] high-octane pace, familiar faces, and new characters". Skogland was inspired by the films of David Lean and Midnight Cowboy (1969) for the series, as well as the French film The Intouchables (2011). The Intouchables helped her "feel secure in exploring some of the vulnerabilities" of Wilson and Barnes, which translated to different approaches to filming each character. For example, Skogland's approach to Wilson was having the camera further back to capture his surroundings, while the approach for Barnes was to try "be in his head" by using close-up shots and a shallow focus that excluded the background.

Location shooting took place in the Atlanta metropolitan area from November 2019 through February 2020. Scenes of Wilson's family home were filmed in Savannah, Georgia, while their family seafood dock was filmed at the Moon River on Skidaway Island. Filming also occurred at Dobbins Air Reserve Base in Marietta, Georgia and Maxwell Air Force Base in Montgomery, Alabama. VanCamp filmed her part for the series simultaneously with her role on the Fox Broadcasting Company series The Resident, since that also shoots in Atlanta. In mid-January, filming was expected to take place in Arecibo, Puerto Rico for two weeks, but production on the island was suspended due to a series of earthquakes that took place. On March 3, the production was revealed to be moving to Prague, Czech Republic, for three weeks until March 25, with filming in the city starting on March 6 and expected to continue until the week of March 16. However, filming was halted on March 10 due to the COVID-19 pandemic and members of the production returned to Atlanta. Stan said filming would be completed once it was safe to do so, estimating that there were at least two or three more weeks of filming needed. In early May, the Czech Republic allowed television and film productions to start up if they followed new hygiene guidelines for cast and crew members, and in June the head of the Czech film commission said cast and crew involved in film and television productions would be exempt from the European Union travel ban on U.S. citizens that was set to take effect on July 1.

Production on the series was scheduled to resume at Pinewood Atlanta Studios in August. Skogland said that the series' crew knew exactly what they needed to film once shooting was able to begin again. Filming occurred at Atlantic Station in Atlanta in early September, and VanCamp finished filming her scenes for the series by the end of that month. Filming in Prague resumed by October 10, with locations including Olšany Cemetery and the Monastery of Saint Gabriel in Smíchov. Mackie said the cast and crew followed strict quarantine and social distancing measures while filming in Prague. The production wrapped on October 23.

Post-production 
Skogland said the series' crew used their time wisely when the production shut down due to the pandemic, allowing them to continue with post-production work on the series and make decisions that they usually would not have time to make. Jeffrey Ford, Kelley Dixon, Todd Desrosiers, and Rosanne Tan edited different episodes of the series. Visual effects were provided by Cantina Creative, Crafty Apes, Digital Frontier FX, Industrial Light & Magic, QPPE, Rodeo FX, Sony Pictures Imageworks, Stereo D, Technicolor VFX, Tippett Studio, Trixter, and Weta Digital.

Music 
Henry Jackman, who scored Captain America: The Winter Soldier and Captain America: Civil War, began scoring the series by December 2020. Because he was returning to the franchise after several years, Jackman started by creating an "audio care package" featuring different themes, orchestrations, and harmonies that he had composed for the Captain America films, to remind himself of that work and organize it before approaching music for the series. Jackman explained that the series format allowed him to write a wider range of music than the films since it still required music for big action sequences while having time for more quiet, character-based moments. He described the music for the latter sequences as being more patient, with "lighter and thinner" instrumentation. The many locations visited in the series also allowed Jackman to explore some environment-specific music, such as elements of the Blues genre when exploring Wilson's backstory in Louisiana, or electronic music for Madripoor which Jackman described as "a grungy rave scenario".

Jackman reprises several of his themes from the films in the series: the composer expanded his Falcon motif from Winter Soldier into a full, classical superhero theme that he combined with some of the Blues elements to acknowledge Wilson's history (the new Falcon theme is used as the series' end credits theme, titled "Louisiana Hero"); Jackman's Winter Soldier theme, which consists of a "scream" and "clangs" that he described as "the last fragments of a human soul trapped inside some mechanistic frame", is heard during callbacks to the character's time as an assassin; Zemo's "spidery, kind of fractious" theme from Civil War returns for that character; and Jackman used an off-key version of his Captain America theme to represent John Walker. Once Walker turns on the titular heroes, Jackman transitioned to the more "operatic" theme that he used for the fight between Captain America and Iron Man in Civil War due to the similarity between the two fights. The composer had written a nostalgic motif for Barnes's civilian identity in The Winter Soldier that was tied to the character's 1940s history, but he decided not to use that in the series as he felt it did not suit the modern version of the character. Instead, he took an element from the end of his Winter Soldier theme that is played on strings in a "disturbing" octatonic scale and "straightened [it] out" into a diatonic scale to create a new civilian melody for the character that is played on strings, piano, and guitar. For the Flag Smashers, Jackman developed a new theme that has a "dystopian vibe".

Jackman's score was recorded by a 53-player orchestra in Berlin, and was released digitally by Marvel Music and Hollywood Records in two volumes: music from the first three episodes was released on April 9, 2021, and music from the last three episodes was released on April 30. "Louisiana Hero" was released as a single on March 26.

Marketing 
A short teaser for The Falcon and the Winter Soldier was shown at the 2019 San Diego Comic-Con, featuring Brühl as Zemo. The character wears his traditional purple mask from the comics in the teaser. Skogland traveled to Budapest, where Brühl was filming The Alienist: Angel of Darkness, to capture the footage. Concept art for the series featuring designs for the characters' costumes are included in Expanding the Universe, a Marvel Studios special that debuted on Disney+ on November 12, 2019.

In December 2019, Feige debuted the first images from the series at Comic Con Experience, which Matt Goldberg of Collider described as more grounded than fellow Disney+ series WandaVision, with a "standard spy thriller" look similar to the Captain America films. A commercial for the series, WandaVision, and Loki was shown during Super Bowl LIV. Julia Alexander of The Verge said there was not much footage, but it offered "enough glimpses to tease fans". Haleigh Foutch at Collider felt of all the Super Bowl commercials, Marvel's teasers "stole the whole show" and had "a lot to get excited about". A trailer for the series was released during Disney Investor Day in December 2020. Writers for Polygon said the trailer "certainly delivered" and made the series look like it was similar in scope to an MCU film. They highlighted the series' villains which the trailer showcased, Zemo and the Flag-Smashers. Angie Han of Mashable felt the trailer promised "explosive action, a jet-setting plot, some very creepy villains, and—best of all—a return of the characters' odd-couple, best-frenemies dynamic" from Civil War. CinemaBlends Laura Hurley said the trailer's action was so epic that it could be the trailer for an MCU film rather than a series. Writing for io9, Charles Pulliam-Moore called the trailer "nothing short of bonkers".

A television spot was shown during Super Bowl LV which announced the release of the second trailer for the series. Ben Pearson of /Film said the trailer was a return to the "quippy, action-heavy, Marvel house style" after the release of the less conventional WandaVision. Pearson wondered how this perspective would have been different if The Falcon and the Winter Soldier was released before WandaVision as was originally planned. Ethan Alter at Yahoo! also compared the trailer to WandaVision, saying the series appeared to "bring the fireworks audiences traditionally expect from MCU adventures". Rolling Stones Brenna Ehrlich called the trailer "replete with explosions, stomach-flipping stunts, and all manner of intrigue". Speaking to Sharon Carter's appearance in the trailer, Ian Cardona of Comic Book Resources felt that even though it was a few seconds, the character was "finally getting the respect she deserves" following her brief appearances in the MCU films. Across various social media platforms, the trailer and television spot had more than 125 million combined views within 24 hours. The trailer became the most-watched for a streaming series, surpassing the 53 million views of the September 2020 WandaVision trailer. It also had 217,000 social media mentions and the highest Google Search volume among all entertainment offerings. Anthony D'Alessandro at Deadline Hollywood noted it was rare for analytics company EDO's top 10 most searched Super Bowl spots list, which measures searches within five minutes of a spot airing, to include a trailer rather than brand ads, but The Falcon and the Winter Soldiers spot was ranked fifth on the list. According to YouTube, the trailer was the sixth most-watched Super Bowl LV ad on the site.

Four episodes of the Disney+ television series Marvel Studios: Legends explore the Falcon, the Winter Soldier, Zemo, and Sharon Carter using footage from their MCU film appearances. The episodes focusing on Falcon and Winter Soldier were released on March 5, 2021, with the Zemo and Sharon Carter episodes released on March 12. Also in March, Xbox released commercials cross-promoting the series with the Xbox Series X and Series S and Xbox Game Pass. The commercials feature Mackie alongside DC Pierson as Aaron, a game store salesman, reprising his role from Captain America: The Winter Soldier where he was an Apple Store employee. Aaron is revealed to be Noobmaster69, the Fortnite player who Thor threatens in Avengers: Endgame. A final trailer for the series was released on March 15. Austen Goslin at Polygon thought it was a good display of the series' story, action, and banter, while Syfy Wires Matthew Jackson felt it clarified that the series would be a "personal fight". He said this and the previous trailers showed that the series could "open up the future for this particular corner" of the MCU. Discussing the trailer for io9, James Whitbrook highlighted the emphasis on the physical and existential threats to Wilson and Barnes, and said he was intrigued by the portrayal of Flag-Smasher as a movement rather than a single character. In January 2021, Marvel announced their "Marvel Must Haves" program, which reveals new toys, games, books, apparel, home decor, and other merchandise related to each episode of the series on the Monday following an episode's release. On March 15, general apparel, Funko Pops, collectibles, accessories, and houseware for the series was revealed for the program, with the "Must Haves" merchandise for the episodes starting on March 22 and concluding on April 26. In June 2021, Hyundai Motor Company released a commercial featuring Mackie as Wilson / Captain America promoting The Falcon and the Winter Soldier and the Hyundai Tucson. The commercial was produced by Marvel alongside similar commercials for WandaVision, Loki, and What If...?, and was meant to tell an "in-world" story set within the narrative of the series. In July, Hasbro unveiled a series-themed version of Monopoly that was set to be released on August 10.

Release 
The Falcon and the Winter Soldier debuted on March 19, 2021, on Disney+. Its six episodes were released weekly, concluding on April 23. The series was originally scheduled for release in August 2020, but this was pushed back after filming was delayed by the COVID-19 pandemic. The series is part of Phase Four of the MCU.

Reception

Audience viewership 
Disney+ announced that "New World Order" was the most-watched series premiere ever for the streaming service in its opening weekend (March 19 to 22, 2021), ahead of the premieres of WandaVision and the second season of The Mandalorian. Additionally, The Falcon and the Winter Soldier was the most-watched title overall globally for that time period on Disney+, including in the Disney+ Hotstar markets. Samba TV reported that 1.7 million households watched the episode in its opening weekend. TVision, which determines viewing impressions by counting its 14,000 viewers on connected televisions who have watched one of nearly 25,000 titles for at least two minutes within a session of watching content for at least five minutes, across all major U.S. streaming and advertising video on demand services, reported that The Falcon and the Winter Soldier was the most-viewed series of April 2021 across measured platforms, being viewed nearly 40 times more than the average series measured by the service.

Critical response 

The review aggregator website Rotten Tomatoes reported an 84% approval rating with an average rating of 7.25/10, based on 336 reviews. The website's critical consensus reads, "Packed with blockbuster action and deft character beats, Falcon and the Winter Soldier proves itself worthy of Captain America's legacy with its globetrotting intrigue, mature social commentary, and the sparky rapport between stars Anthony Mackie and Sebastian Stan." Metacritic, which uses a weighted average, assigned a score of 74 out of 100 based on 32 critics, indicating "generally favorable reviews".

The Falcon and the Winter Soldier was praised "for bringing the Black experience to the forefront" through its tackling of issues such as racial discrimination and confronting "the original sins of America building itself on the backs of Black people". David Betancourt, reviewing the season finale for The Washington Post, analyzed the racial themes surrounding the character of Sam Wilson, a Black man, acquiring the mantle of Captain America. Noting that the series was originally planned to debut in 2020, before being delayed by the COVID-19 pandemic, Betancourt believed there was "something eerily timely about a Black Captain America flying in the sky days after the verdict in the murder of George Floyd" and also pointed to Barnes potentially being in a relationship with Leah, an Asian woman, also "at a time when Asian Americans don't feel safe in America because of racist attacks". While these occurrences happening in the series would not "fix anything", Betancourt said "you can't help but feel something when you see it".

Brian Lowry writing for CNN said, "Overall the series deftly accomplished its primary mission, which was to explore the dramatic tension in Wilson becoming Captain America, in a way that went beyond just being told the shield now belonged to him. It also continued to demonstrate Marvel's ability to mount big, muscular action in productions for Disney+, while showcasing the depth of its universe." Calling the series "flawed but fun", Brian Tallerico of Vulture stated that The Falcon and the Winter Soldier "often felt rushed and lacked some depth in its analysis of race and power in this country" but served its purpose as an origin story for Wilson's Captain America while setting up future MCU projects. In terms of how it would be remembered, he felt that it would be "hard to gauge its full impact" until its plot threads were picked up in future MCU projects, as was the case with most MCU entries.

The pacing of the series received some criticism. In his review of the first episode, Alec Bojalad of Den of Geek believed releasing the series' episodes weekly was a detriment overall, since the first episode played as the first act of a larger story and felt "frustratingly incomplete at times" compared to how watching the full series at once would likely feel. This was in contrast to Marvel Studios' first series, WandaVision, which had been "unquestionably an episodic experience" with each episode standing on its own and having episode television-style cliffhanger endings. By the third episode, Alan Sepinwall of Rolling Stone felt the series was "leaning way into the 'six-hour movie' model at this point, where the only concern is advancing the plot by any means necessary, regardless of how interesting it is on its own". He believed compared to WandaVision, which was "very clearly built to be consumed weekly", The Falcon and the Winter Soldier would have been better to view all at once than as weekly episodes. Sepinwall ultimately concluded The Falcon and the Winter Soldier "was trying to do way more than it could comfortably handle", having too many characters and plot threads that writers could not successfully execute fully, with individual episodes that felt "sluggish" despite a lot happening in them, because "those various incidents don't do much beyond inching the plot forward".

Noel Murray said in The New York Times that The Falcon and the Winter Soldier was "largely enjoyable if scattershot" given it "meandered too much, shoehorning in too many side characters and too much Marvel mythology". However, it was still "a rush" to see Wilson "zooming through the air", first as Falcon in the first episode, and then again as Captain America in the sixth episode, which was "even more satisfying". Entertainment Weeklys Darren Franich gave the series a "D", believing there were glimpses of what the series "could have been". He said, "this unmarvelous Disney+ quagmire buried its best instincts underneath uninspired cameos, geopolitical stupidity, and spin-off teases. Creator Malcolm Spellman struggled to keep Sam in the foreground, but the sprawling tale lost focus."

Accolades 

Ahead of the final episode's release, Marvel Studios decided to submit The Falcon and the Winter Soldier in the drama series categories for the Primetime Emmy Awards rather than in the limited series categories. Moore explained that this decision was made around the launch of the series, with Marvel Studios feeling that the drama categories were "appropriate for what the show is trying to tackle" since it was "a bit more dramatic" than the company's previous content. He added that there had not yet been any consideration if Stan and Mackie would both be submitted for Outstanding Lead Actors or if one would be submitted for Outstanding Supporting Actor; Mackie and Stan were both submitted for Outstanding Lead Actor.

Documentary special 

In February 2021, the documentary series Marvel Studios: Assembled was announced. The special on this series, Assembled: The Making of The Falcon and the Winter Soldier, goes behind the scenes of the series, with Spellman, Skogland, Stan, Mackie, Russell, Kellyman, Cheadle, Brühl, VanCamp, Kasumba, Louis-Dreyfus, and others discussing the importance of racial issues within the narrative, the action scenes, and the impact of the COVID-19 pandemic on the production of the series. The special was released on Disney+ on April 30, 2021.

Future 

Before the series premiere, Mackie said there had been no discussions regarding a second season of the series. He was also not sure when he would next appear in an MCU film, especially due to the COVID-19 pandemic's impact on cinemas. Skogland said she was unsure if there would be a second season and felt that she had been able to do everything that she wanted in the first six episodes, but she did say that there were more stories and characters to explore if a second season was made. Feige said there were ideas for what "another one" could be if a second season was made, but Marvel intended for the series to lead into future MCU films first like they did with WandaVision. He added that he did not want to spoil the series by confirming a second season or discussing the plans that Marvel had for the series' characters before the series was fully released. In April 2021, Moore said the end of the series would show story elements for a potential second season, adding that the series explored "evergreen" topics that lent themselves to further exploration, unlike the contained story of WandaVision.

On April 23, 2021, the same day the series' final episode was released, Spellman and series writer Dalan Musson were revealed to be writing the script for a fourth Captain America film that was expected to revolve around Wilson and continue from the events of the series. Nick Romano of Entertainment Weekly believed a second season with the title Captain America and the Winter Soldier had been "inevitable" given the way the series ended. However, knowing the report about the fourth Captain America film added to the intrigue of what direction Marvel Studios would go in, considering past comments from Feige and others implying the series would get a proper second season. Mackie was unaware of any plans for a film or second season, but was "excited to see what happens"; he had signed a deal to star in the film that August. Julius Onah was chosen to direct the film in July 2022, and the film was officially announced later that month at San Diego Comic-Con as Captain America: New World Order. Ramirez and Lumbly reprise their roles in the film and are joined by Tim Blake Nelson as Samuel Sterns / Leader from The Incredible Hulk (2008) and Shira Haas as Sabra. Harrison Ford will appear as Thaddeus Ross, replacing original actor William Hurt following his death. It is scheduled to be released on May 3, 2024.

Notes

References

External links 

 
 
 

 
2020s American science fiction television series
2020s American television miniseries
2021 American television series debuts
2021 American television series endings
American action adventure television series
American black superhero television shows
Captain America television series
Disney+ original programming
English-language television shows
Marvel Cinematic Universe: Phase Four television series
Post-traumatic stress disorder in fiction
Prosthetics in fiction
Psychiatry in fiction
Racism in television
Refugees and displaced people in fiction
Television productions suspended due to the COVID-19 pandemic
Television series about siblings
Television series by Marvel Studios
Television series set in 2024
Television series set in fictional countries
Television series set on fictional islands
Television shows based on works by Jack Kirby
Television shows based on works by Stan Lee
Television shows directed by Kari Skogland
Television shows filmed at Pinewood Atlanta Studios
Television shows filmed in Atlanta
Television shows filmed in Georgia (U.S. state)
Television shows filmed in the Czech Republic
Television shows scored by Henry Jackman
Television shows set in Europe
Terrorism in television
Works by Malcolm Spellman